Oris Fergus (date of birth unknown) is a former West Indian cricketer. Fergus' batting and bowling styles are unknown. He was born on Montserrat.

Fergus first played for Montserrat against St Kitts in the 1971 Hesketh Bell Shield. His last recorded match for the team came against Nevis in the 1977 Heineken Challenge Trophy. He later made two first-class appearances for Leeward Islands in 1978, with both matches coming against the Windward Islands. In his two matches, he scored 25 runs at an average of 12.50, with a high score of 17 not out. With the ball, he took 3 wickets at a bowling average of 20.33, with best figures of 2/20.

References

External links
Oris Fergus at ESPNcricinfo
Oris Fergus at CricketArchive

Year of birth missing (living people)
Montserratian cricketers
Leeward Islands cricketers
Living people